Pablo Arturo Metlich Ruíz (born 2 September 1978) is a Mexican former professional footballer, who last played as a midfielder for Atlético San Luis. Metlich made his professional debut with Tecos in 2002. He is of partial Serbian descent.

External links
 
 
 

1978 births
Living people
Footballers from Durango
Association football midfielders
Liga MX players
Tecos F.C. footballers
Lobos BUAP footballers
Indios de Ciudad Juárez footballers
C.D. Veracruz footballers
Mexican people of Serbian descent
Mexican footballers